The Treaty of Den Haag (also known as the Treaty of The Hague) was signed on December 27, 1949 between representatives from Indonesia and the Netherlands. Based on the terms of the treaty, the Netherlands granted independence to Indonesia except for the West Irian. The accord officially established the Netherlands-Indonesia Union whereby Indonesia was transformed into a federation.   

Treaties of Indonesia
Treaties concluded in 1949
1949 in the Netherlands
1949 in Indonesia
Den Haag (1949)
Indonesia–Netherlands relations
Indonesian National Revolution
20th century in The Hague
December 1949 events in Europe